Redlichia chinensis is a n extinct species of trilobite that existed from 526 million years ago to 513 million years ago in the early Cambrian period (4th stage).

Ecology 
The species is a nektobenthic deposit feeder.

History 
R. chinensis was discovered by Chang in 1966 in the Balang formation, China. 19 fossils have been discovered.

Morphology 
R. chinensis has a wide cephalon with a border and the glaella tapers forwards. The hypostoma has been pushed through from the underside and the genal spines are not at the occipital edge. The thorax narrows to a small pygidium and the pleurae terminate in short spines. R. chinensis is 7.5 centimeters long.

Reference 

Redlichiidae